Paul Randolph, aka "Randolph" is an American bass player, singer, songwriter, and producer from Detroit, Michigan. His musical style ranges from jazz, funk, soul, house, rock and electronica.  He is best known as the vocalist for the German collective, Jazzanova. Randolph has performed with well-known musicians, including Tony Allen, Odetta, Alice Cooper, Amp Fiddler, Hubert Laws, Josh White Jr, Mark Farner and Nigel Hall.

Early life and education
Randolph was born in Philadelphia, Pennsylvania. He and his family relocated to Sao Paulo, Brazil when he was six years old, where he learned to play guitar. He graduated from Central Michigan University with a degree in Marketing.

Career
Randolph joined the Detroit-based New Orleans-style funk and blues band, Mudpuppy as lead vocalist and bassist, along with fellow Detroit musician, Amp Fiddler. The pair later performed and recorded as a duo. During this time, Randolph also released his first solo CD, This Is...What It Is" in 2004 on Kenny Dixon, Jr.'s  Mahogani Music label.  His second solo album, Lonely Eden was released in 2007, with contributions from  Stephanie McKay and Waajeed.

Randolph's overseas travels with Amp Fiddler lead him to meet members of the group Jazzanova. Randolph was the lead vocalist on three singles from Jazzanova's 2008 album Of All The Things on Sonar Kollektiv, which peaked at number six on the Billboard Chart's Top Contemporary Jazz category. He also sang on the 2012 Jazzanova release, Funkhaus Studio Sessions (Sonar Kollektiv). He was named 2010 Artist of the Year by Real Detroit Weekly,  Paul has releases between 2012 and 2017 that include, “Chips ‘n Chitlins” with legendary dub- step producer Zed Bias of Manchester UK; Isoul8 - “Stay- Stay-Stay” and ”Waves of Love”; DJ Kawasaki (Japan)- “Where Would We Be”; BoddhiSatva (Africa)- “Soldier”; Mikael Delta (Greece) -“This Is The Place”; and  Opolopo (Sweden)- “Sustain”. In 2017 a duet written and produced for jazz singer Kathy Kosins - “Could You Be Me”, and a collaboration with South African dance music producer Ralf Gum - “We Repeat”.

In 2018 Paul debuted the single “Heavy” from his third album “In The Company Of Others”, with remixes by British producer Ashley Beedle, andauthored the song “It’s Beautiful” for Jazzanova‘s “The Pool” album. In2019 two of his productions as a solo instrumentalist “Will The Party Ever End” and “Dancing In The Moon Light” charted favorably on the Smooth Jazz and Indie Soul charts. Paul’s production of “Put The Voodoo On Me” earned him a Grammy nomination, and his production of “What You Do To Me” garnered enthusiastic commercial recognition. In late 2019 Paul was requested by legendary Rock producer Bob Erzin (Pink Floyd, Kiss, Lou Reed, Alice Cooper), to record bass and background vocals on AliceCooper’s “Breadcrumbs” EP. Shortly after these sessions he was hired as bassist and background singer for Mark Farner formerly of Grand Funk Railroad. His 2020 productions included two singles with Jazz flutist Hubert Laws, as well as other solo releases and collaborative releases. The year 2021 yielded a call back and co-production with Bob Erzin for the Billboard #1 Rock Album of 2021 Alice Cooper “Detroit Stories”.  In 2022 he sang and recorded bass for the Americas Got Talent Golden Buzzer receiving “Detroit Youth Choir” full length album “Rockspell”.

In addition to his musical talents Paul is also a voiceover artist and session singer in good standing with SAG/AFTRA and has done national spots for the likes of McDonalds, and Corona Beer. In 2022 Paul started his own record label Sun Temple Records, has charting productions and a schedule of future releases. Paul Randolph transcends genre and is often described by his peers as a musical chameleon whofearlessly and seamlessly cross-pollinates genres in an endless pursuit of reinvention.

Discography

Albums 

 This Is...What It Is (Mahogani Music, 2004)
 Lonely Eden (Still Music, 2007)
 Echoes (Of Lonely Eden) (Still Music, 2010)
 Chipz 'N Chittlins w/ Zed Bias (P-Vine, 2012)

Singles  

 The Real Thang – Van Renn (1993)
 The Man – Van Renn (1994)
 The (Real) Love Thang – L'Homme Van Renn (1995)
 Luv + Affection – L'Homme Van Renn (1996)
 People Make The World Go Round – Innerzone Orchestra 
 Sucker for a Pretty Face – Trus Me – In The Red
 On My Heart – ISoul8 feat. Paul Randolph
 I Love You – As One feat. Paul Randolph
 I'm Down – As One feat. Paul Randolph
 Don't Take It Personal – Wahoo feat. Paul Randolph
 Ruff N Tuff – Tettory Bad
 Let Me Show Ya – Jazzanova feat. Paul Randolph
 Lucky Girl – Jazzanova featuring Paul Randolph 
 Dial A Cliche – Jazzanova feat. Paul Randolph
 Truth – The Clonious feat. Paul Randolph
 Shine Your Light – Simbad & Paul Randolph
 Joy Vibration – Tomson feat. Paul Randolph
 Magic – John Arnold feat. Paul Randolph
 Tower of Love – Makoto feat. Paul Randolph
 My Magic – Zoetic feat. Paul Randolph
 Stay, Stay, Stay – ISoul8 feat. Paul Randolph
 Waves of Love – ISoul8 feat. Paul Randolph
 Captain of Her Heart – Kiko Navarro feat. Paul Randolph
 I Human – Jazzanova feat Paul Randolph
 I'm Free – Catz N Dogs feat. Paul Randolph
 Soldier – Boddhi Satva Paul Randolph
 Luminous Stasis – Dial 81 feat. Paul Randolph
 Especially For You – Rodney Hunter feat. Paul Randolph

References

External links 
 Randolph Official Artist Page on Facebook
 Paul Randolph Myspace Page
 Paul Randolph Soundcloud Page

Musicians from Detroit
Musicians from Michigan
Living people
Year of birth missing (living people)